Evergrey is a Swedish progressive metal band from Gothenburg.

History
Evergrey was formed in 1995 in Gothenburg, Sweden as a progressive power metal band, in contrast to the melodic death metal that Gothenburg is known for. Since then, the band's lyrics have always been of the darker sort, and the same can be said of the band's imagery. The Dark Discovery was recorded in 1996 and released in 1998, and Solitude, Dominance, Tragedy was recorded and released in 1999. While those two albums dealt with a variety of ideas, many later albums have been concept albums, dealing with issues like paranoia and alien abduction in In Search of Truth (2001).

Recreation Day, released in 2003, is an album that covers many issues, ranging from death and mourning to general fear and sorrow, all of which contribute to a greater concept of self-reformation. These ideas are explored from many different points of view, such as someone contemplating suicide ("As I Lie Here Bleeding"), mourners after a funeral ("I'm Sorry", a cover of Dilba Demirbag's hit), and dying people's looking back on their "unforgivable" sins ("Unforgivable"). "Unforgivable" also acted as a catalyst for the next album, The Inner Circle (2004), which expanded on the issues described in the song: cults, religion and child abuse.

On 4 April 2006, Evergrey released their sixth studio album, Monday Morning Apocalypse. It debuted at No. 6 in Sweden.

Later that year, Evergrey played at many festivals throughout Europe: among others, Sweden Rock Festival, Download Festival, Arvika Festival, Masters of Rock, Storsjöyran and Sziget Festival. From 5 to 30 May, the band toured the United States with In Flames, Nevermore and Throwdown. On 15 September, they headlined Prog Power VII in Atlanta, Georgia.

On 24 October 2006, Evergrey started a new European tour. They were supported by fellow Swedish death metal band Avatar, and they visited Germany, Italy, Spain, France, the Netherlands, Belgium, the United Kingdom, Denmark, and Sweden.

Evergrey released their seventh studio album, Torn, in September 2008, continuing with their trademark lyrical themes of desperation and despair. Jari Kainulainen permanently filled the role on 6 August 2007, who also played bass on Torn.

On 8 May 2008, Evergrey announced that they had signed a deal with Steamhammer/SPV. This included the release of their new album and the entire back catalogue. It also was announced that the new album, Torn, would be released early in September 2008. As the deal includes the band's entire back catalog, there is the possibility of re-releases of previous Evergrey albums with the inclusion of added bonus material.

In July 2008, Swedish/Danish band Amaranthe announced that keyboardist Rikard Zander, along with In Flames bassist Peter Iwers, would make a guest appearance on their upcoming album.

In May 2010, it was announced that Jonas Ekdahl, Henrik Danhage and Jari Kainulainen have all left Evergrey by mutual decision because of problems with the band members interacting with each other. They called it quits as to not ruin the friendship they all have with each other.

An article posted on 13 November 2010 on Evergrey's blog contained dates for upcoming concerts as well as the confirmation of a new album titled Glorious Collision on 28 February 2011.

Via Facebook posts in November 2013, while writing the next Evergrey album due for release in 2014, the band first confirmed that drummer Hannes Van Dahl would be leaving the band to join Sabaton full-time, and then due to "problems working together" guitarist Marcus Jidell would also be leaving.

In August 2014, the release of the music video for "King of Errors" from the forthcoming Hymns for the Broken revealed that Henrik Danhage and Jonas Ekdahl had returned to the band. Hymns for the Broken was released in September 2014. The band released two more albums after that, The Storm Within in 2016 and The Atlantic in 2019. Those three albums were mixed and mastered by Jacob Hansen and form a conceptual trilogy.

Evergrey's twelfth studio album, Escape of the Phoenix, was released on 26 February 2021. It was elected by Metal Hammer as the 10th best progressive metal album of 2021.

On 26 August 2021 Evergrey announced they signed a new deal with Napalm Records and are already working on a new album.

On 24 February 2022 Evergrey announced the release of their thirteenth studio album, A Heartless Portrait (The Orphean Testament), which was released on Napalm Records on 20 May 2022.

Personnel

Current lineup
 Tom S. Englund – vocals, guitar (1995–present)
 Henrik Danhage – guitar, backing vocals (2000–2010, 2014–present)
 Rikard Zander – keyboards, backing vocals (2002–present)
 Jonas Ekdahl – drums (2003–2010, 2014–present)
 Johan Niemann – bass, backing vocals (2010–present)

Guest musician
 Carina Kjellberg-Englund – female vocals (1996–present)

Former members
 Patrick Carlsson – drums (1996–2003)
 Dan Bronell – guitar (1996–2000)
 Daniel Nöjd – bass, vocals (1996–1999)
 Will Chandra – keyboards (1996–1998)
 Sven Karlsson – keyboards (1998–2001)
 Michael Håkansson – bass (1999–2006)
 Christian Rehn – keyboards (2001–2002)
 Fredrik Larsson – bass (2007)
 Jari Kainulainen – bass (2007–2010)
 Marcus Jidell – guitar, backing vocals (2010–2013)
 Hannes Van Dahl – drums (2010–2013)

Timeline

Discography 

 The Dark Discovery (1998)
 Solitude, Dominance, Tragedy (1999)
 In Search of Truth (2001)
 Recreation Day (2003)
 The Inner Circle (2004)
 Monday Morning Apocalypse (2006)
 Torn (2008)
 Glorious Collision (2011)
 Hymns for the Broken (2014)
 The Storm Within (2016)
 The Atlantic (2019)
 Escape Of The Phoenix (2021)
 A Heartless Portrait (The Orphean Testament) (2022)

References

External links

Official website
Interview With Tom Englund

Musical groups from Gothenburg
Swedish progressive metal musical groups
Swedish power metal musical groups
Musical groups established in 1995
AFM Records artists
Inside Out Music artists